Mostly Sunny is a 2016 Canadian documentary directed by Dilip Mehta. The film presents a biography of actress Sunny Leone.

Synopsis
Sunny Leone is a Canadian-born actress who moved to the United States and established a career in pornographic cinema. She then became a major star in India's Bollywood film industry. Footage of Leone was filmed in Canada, India, Malaysia, the United Kingdom and the United States.

Release
Mostly Sunny premiered at the Toronto International Film Festival on 11 September 2016. It was given a limited release in Canadian theatres on 13 January 2017.

Controversy 
During the promotion of the film, Sunny wanted any frontal nudity to be removed in an attempt to reinvent her image in Bollywood. However, Dilip refused to make any changes, leading to Sunny shunning the movie's premiere during the Toronto International Film Festival, and going so far as not being on talking terms with the director.
 The official response from Sunny was that she was attending a Bar Mitzvah in New York, hence the lack of promotions.

Reception
Norman Wilner of Toronto's Now weekly panned the production, indicating that Mehta was "padding it with montages and even retelling stories in order to fill time.". As of 2017, the movie currently has a 33% rating on Rotten Tomatoes.

References

External links
 
 
 Sunny Leone on Bollywood Hungama

2016 films
Canadian documentary films
Documentary films about actors
Documentary films about women in film
Documentary films about pornography
Documentary films about the cinema of India
2016 documentary films
2010s Canadian films